Dagoberto Lara Soriano (born 16 April 1952) is a Cuban footballer. He competed in the men's tournament at the 1980 Summer Olympics.

References

External links
 

1952 births
Living people
Cuban footballers
Cuba international footballers
Association football forwards
FC Cienfuegos players
Olympic footballers of Cuba
Footballers at the 1980 Summer Olympics
Pan American Games medalists in football
Pan American Games silver medalists for Cuba
Footballers at the 1979 Pan American Games
People from Cienfuegos
Medalists at the 1979 Pan American Games